Tsinghua University School of Economics and Management (abbreviation: Tsinghua SEM; Chinese: 清华大学经济管理学院, qīng huá dà xué jīng jì guǎn lǐ xué yuàn ), is the business school of Tsinghua University in Beijing, China. The school offers undergraduate, master, doctoral, and many executive education programs, with a total enrollment of more than 3,000 students.

History

Early history
The history of Tsinghua SEM dates back to 1926, when Tsinghua University established its Faculty of Economics. In 1956, when the Chinese government decided to regroup higher education institutions in an attempt to build a Soviet-style education system, the Faculty of Economics was separated from Tsinghua and merged into other universities.

Revival
In 1979, with the Chinese economic reform taking place, Tsinghua University began setting up a new School of Economics and Management Engineering. The School of Economics and Management was officially established in 1984, with Zhu Rongji serving as the first dean.

Rankings and reputation
The Tsinghua School of Economics and Management (SEM) is consistently ranked among the best business schools in China. It was the first mainland Chinese institution to have achieved AACSB and EQUIS accreditations for its business and accounting programs. Founded in 1984, SEM was the first school of economics and management in China. Its founding Dean, Professor Zhu Rongji, later became the fifth Premier of the People's Republic of China. Tsinghua SEM is the successor to Tsinghua University's Department of Economics, which was originally established in 1926. Its main competitor is Guanghua School of Management, Peking University.

Today, SEM's professional and academic programs are considered to be among the premier training grounds for China's business leaders.

In 2021, SEM was ranked 11th globally in the Times Higher Education Rankings by Subjects for "Economics and Business" subjects. It was ranked 23rd in "Accounting and Finance" subjects, 25th in "Economics and Econometrics" subjects and 31st in "Business and Management Studies" subjects by the QS World University Rankings by Subjects, which are historical strengths for the Tsinghua School of Economics and Management.

Academics

Areas of study
There are 8 majors within SEM, namely: management science and engineering, finance, economics, accounting, corporation strategy and policy, marketing, human resources management, and technology economics and management.

Research centers
The school also operates a number of prominent research centers, including: the Research Center for Contemporary Management, the Research Center for Technological Innovation, the National Entrepreneurship Research Center, the China Center for Financial Research, the National Center for Economic Research, the China Retail Research Center, the China Business Research Center, the Center for China in the World Economy, the Research Center for Contemporary Management and Technological Innovation, and the China Insurance and Risk Management Research Center.

Faculty
Since 2006, Tsinghua SEM has been recruiting faculty from reputable Ph.D. programs around the world. A majority of new faculty members have international educational backgrounds, representing such alma maters and prior faculty assignments as Harvard, Yale, Wharton (University of Pennsylvania), MIT Sloan, and Stanford.

Student body
Tsinghua SEM's undergraduate program is known in mainland China as one of the two most competitive undergraduate business programs (the other being the undergraduate program in Guanghua School of Management of Peking University). More than half of the students admitted to Tsinghua SEM rank in the top 10 in their respective provinces on the National Higher Education Entrance Examination (also known as the Gaokao).

Advisory board
Initiated by SEM's Founding Dean Zhu Rongji, the advisory board of Tsinghua SEM was established in October 2000. Since its establishment, the advisory board has met annually to offer advice on the development of Tsinghua SEM. The advisory board has provided tremendous help in the following initiatives:
 Contributing ideas and formulating strategies to make Tsinghua SEM a world-class school
 Promoting faculty development at Tsinghua SEM
 Supporting the establishment of research centers
 Funding research projects

Tsinghua SEM's advisory board is unique from those of many academic institutions in that it consists largely of non-Tsinghua alumni. Among the most prominent international advisory board members are Mark Zuckerberg, Elon Musk, Tim Cook, Stephen Schwarzman, Henry Paulson, Muhtar Kent, and Carlos Ghosn; Chinese Advisory Board members include Jack Ma, Pony Ma, and Robin Li, among others.

MBA and EMBA programs 
Tsinghua SEM's Global and part-time MBA programs are among the most competitive MBA programs in the People's Republic of China. The entirely English Global MBA program is offered in collaboration with the MIT Sloan School of Management. After two years of business and leadership education, students obtain a Masters of Business Administration (MBA) degree from Tsinghua University as well as a certificate from the MIT Sloan School of Management and MIT Sloan affiliate alumni status.

SEM also offers an executive MBA ("EMBA") program in partnership with INSEAD. The Tsinghua-INSEAD Dual Degree Executive MBA program was initiated in 2006 and is the first program of its kind in China, combining international executive business education with a focus on Asia. The program's first class enrolled in the summer of 2007. The program is taught jointly by the two schools’ faculties and focuses on developing the participants’ leadership skills, building their global mindsets, and honing their managerial talents. Upon successful completion of the program, participants are awarded two degrees: an EMBA degree by Tsinghua University and an MBA for Executives degree by INSEAD. Graduates become alumni of the two schools.

With the Kering Academy and HEC Business School in Paris, Tsinghua offers an 18-month executive program focused on educating "managers identified as high-potential talents at Kering and its brands operating in China."

Tsinghua-MIT Global MBA

The Tsinghua-MIT Global MBA is a two-year, full-time MBA program born out of a collaboration between Tsinghua University and Massachusetts Institute of Technology (MIT). Tsinghua has partnered with MIT since 1996 and first established the International MBA (IMBA) program in 1997.

In 2007, the MIT-Tsinghua China Lab was jointly launched by the Sloan School of Management, Tsinghua SEM, and five other business schools to provide China-focused enterprise management and consulting services.

In 2013, the IMBA program and Tsinghua's Chinese-instructed full-time MBA (FMBA) program were integrated into the Tsinghua-MIT Global MBA (GMBA) program, based primarily on Tsinghua's campus with elective module and dual-degree options on MIT's campus as well as a GMBA-specific seminar series and elective courses from visiting MIT Sloan faculty on Tsinghua's campus. Of the restructure, MIT Sloan Professor S.P. Kothari asserted, "It is not just a renaming, but it actually reflects the world change ... MIT has been collaborating with Tsinghua for 17 years. We have the foresight in predicting that the sun will shine directly on China and we wanted to bask in that sunshine."

The GMBA program now offers global courses and elective modules in cooperation with several other highly ranked universities as well as international teaching resources in both English and Chinese. It is particularly visible as an academic collaboration between the United States and China by virtue of frequent lectures and course offerings from prominent executives and business thought leaders.

Academics and program structure
Unlike most Western MBA programs, the Tsinghua-MIT Global MBA (GMBA) program adheres to a thesis (or "graduation case report") requirement for graduating students. In contrast to a fairly rigid first-year curriculum similar to those of many Western MBA programs, the second-year GMBA experience balances a more flexible variety of on-campus elective coursework at Tsinghua, academic exchange stints abroad, work opportunities for domestic and international students, and thesis completion and defense. Upon completion of required courses, students may select from varying curricular tracks such as banking, enterprise innovation, accounting analysis, and international business administration. After two academic years (21 months) of business and leadership education, students obtain a Masters of Business Administration (MBA) degree from Tsinghua University as well as a certificate from the MIT Sloan School of Management and receive MIT Sloan affiliate alumni status. Besides the international orientation, the program aims to immerse students into Chinese language and culture. The GMBA program is distinct from Tsinghua's three-year part-time MBA (PMBA) program, which is open to domestic and international students with Chinese-language skills and is offered on evenings and weekends.

Leading economic and business thought leaders give regular guest lectures, including McKinsey Chairman Dominic Barton, Rio Tinto CEO Tom Albanese, and Walmart President Doug McMillon. During the 2015–16 academic year, elective courses available to first- and second-year GMBA students included one- to two-week module courses delivered by Peter Thiel and Harvard Professor Niall Ferguson. In recent years, Mark Zuckerberg, Elon Musk, Tim Cook, and other CEOs have given guest lectures and participated in dialogues with GMBA students during the annual advisory board meeting at Tsinghua SEM. In 2015, Zuckerberg posted one such lecture, describing it as "my first ever speech in Chinese" and describing Tsinghua SEM as "a great center of innovation."

The instructional faculty within the GMBA program is consistently recruited from high-ranking global Ph.D. programs. A majority of incoming GMBA faculty members have international academic backgrounds, and many possess degrees and teaching experience at universities such as Harvard, Yale, Columbia, Stanford, and MIT.

Partnerships
The Tsinghua-MIT Global MBA program (GMBA) incorporates collaborations across several other globally oriented universities. The GMBA program offers dual-degree opportunities with MIT, HEC Paris, and Columbia University in New York City. By 2013, the GMBA program maintained partnerships with 58 universities in 26 different countries. The program also offers short-term overseas modules at MIT Sloan, Stanford University's Graduate School of Business, and other partner institutions. Visiting faculty and guest professors from both MIT and a variety of other universities come to Tsinghua each year and offer lectures and module courses for GMBA students.

Notable people
Li Zinai, Professor of Economics

References

Tsinghua University
Business schools in China